This is a list of magazines from Mauritius.

See also 

 Media of Mauritius
 Lists of magazines
 List of newspapers in Mauritius
 List of radio stations in Mauritius

Mauritius
Lists of mass media in Mauritius